Sinbad  is a 1976 album by jazz keyboardist, Weldon Irvine.

Reception 
The Allmusic review by Jason Ankeny awarded the album 4 stars stating:
Recorded with an exemplary supporting cast featuring pianist Don Blackman, guitarist Eric Gale, and saxophonist Michael Brecker, Sinbad explores the extremes of Weldon Irvine's music, juxtaposing several of the keyboardist's funkiest, most energetic grooves to date alongside mellow, contemplative performances of uncommon intricacy and beauty. Inspired in both sound and spirit by the soul-searching Motown efforts of Marvin Gaye and Stevie Wonder, complete with covers of their respective "What's Going On" and "Don't You Worry 'Bout a Thing," Sinbad contrasts the elegant soul-jazz contours and luminous, horn-driven arrangements of the title cut and "Do Something for Yourself" alongside the nuances and soft pastels of "I Love You" and "Music Is the Key." The resiliency of Irvine's vision and the vibrant performances of his collaborators nevertheless create a kind of yin-yang dynamic that enables the album's divided soul to operate in harmony.

Track listings
All songs written by Weldon Irvine; unless noted

"Sinbad"     6:21   
"Don't You Worry 'Bout a Thing" - (Stevie Wonder)     5:51   
"What's Goin' On?" - (Marvin Gaye)     4:38   
"I Love You" - (Don Blackman)     3:03   
"Do Something for Yourself"     4:45   
"Music is the Key" - (Weldon Irvine, T. Smith)     7:36   
"Here's Where I Came In"     3:36   
"Gospel Feeling"     4:16

Personnel
Weldon Irvine - Keyboards, Synthesizer, Conductor
Don Blackman - Acoustic Piano, Lead Vocals
Cornell Dupree, Eric Gale - Guitar 
Chris Parker, Steve Gadd - Drums
Gordon Edwards - Bass
Richard Tee - Acoustic Piano
Napoleon Revels-Bey - Percussion
Michael Brecker - Tenor Saxophone 
Phil Bodner - Baritone Saxophone
George Young - Alto Saxophone
Randy Brecker - Trumpet
Alan Raph - Bass Trombone
Wayne Andre - Trombone
Adrienne Albert, Bunny McCullough, Deborah McDuffie - Background Vocals
Ted CoConis - artwork

References

External links
 Weldon Irvine-Sinbad at Discogs

1976 albums
RCA Records albums
Weldon Irvine albums
Albums conducted by Weldon Irvine
Albums arranged by Weldon Irvine